Phyllostachydis is a Latin adjective that is derived from the Phyllostachys bamboo genus. It may refer to:
 Folium Phyllostachydis, a bamboo leaves medicinal preparation.

It also refers to several bambusicolous species.

 Aithaloderma phyllostachydis, Hara, 1931, a fungus species of the genus Aithaloderma
 Berkleasmium phyllostachydis, a fungus species of the genus Berkleasmium
 Ceratosphaeria phyllostachydis, Y.R. Liao, a fungus species of the genus Ceratosphaeria
 Favolaschia phyllostachydis, a fungus species of the genus Favolaschia
 Kuwanaspis phyllostachydis, an insect species of the genus Kuwanaspis
 Lasmenia phyllostachydis, Sawada, a fungus species of the genus Lasmenia, Incertae sedis
 Roussoëlla phyllostachydis (I. Hino & Katum.) I. Hino & Katum., a fungus species of the genus Roussoëlla
 Yoshinagella phyllostachydis, a fungus species of the genus Yoshinagella

See also
 Phyllostachydicola (disambiguation)